The 2015 FIFA Club World Cup final was the final match of the 2015 FIFA Club World Cup, an association football tournament hosted by Japan. It was the 12th final of the FIFA Club World Cup, a FIFA-organised tournament between the winners of the six continental confederations as well as the host nation's league champions.

The final was contested between Argentine club River Plate, representing CONMEBOL as the reigning champions of the Copa Libertadores and Spanish club Barcelona, representing UEFA as the reigning champions of the UEFA Champions League. It was played at the International Stadium Yokohama in Yokohama on 20 December 2015.
Barcelona won the game 3–0 to claim their third FIFA Club World Cup title.	
The win for Barcelona was also their fifth trophy of 2015.

Background

River Plate
River Plate qualified for the tournament as winners of the 2015 Copa Libertadores, following a 3–0 aggregate win against UANL in the final. This was River Plate's first time competing in the tournament. They have played two times in the Intercontinental Cup, the predecessor of the FIFA Club World Cup, with one win (1986) and one loss (1996). They reached the final after defeating Japanese club Sanfrecce Hiroshima in the semi-finals.

Barcelona
Barcelona qualified for the tournament as winners of the 2014–15 UEFA Champions League, following a 3–1 win against Juventus in the final. This was Barcelona's fourth time competing in the tournament, after winning twice in 2009 and 2011, as well as being runners-up in 2006. They have played one time in the Intercontinental Cup, with one loss (1992). They reached the final after defeating Chinese club Guangzhou Evergrande in the semi-finals.

Route to the final

Match

Summary

Details

Statistics

References

External links

Final
2015
FC Barcelona matches
Club Atlético River Plate matches
2015–16 in Spanish football
FIFA
Sports competitions in Yokohama
2010s in Yokohama